Andrey Semenyuk (born March 10, 1971) is a retired diver from Belarus, who won the gold medal in the Men's 1m Springboard event at the 1991 European Championships in Athens, Greece. He represented Belarus at the 1996 Summer Olympics in Atlanta, Georgia.

References
 

1971 births
Living people
Belarusian male divers
Divers at the 1996 Summer Olympics
Olympic divers of Belarus